"Sober" is a song recorded by American country music group Little Big Town. It was released on September 30, 2013 as the fourth single from their fifth studio album, Tornado. The song was written by Liz Rose, Hillary Lindsey, and Lori McKenna.

Critical reception
The song received a favorable review from Taste of Country, which called it "a sweet love song bathed in four-part harmonies reminiscent of the group’s most popular cuts from the mid ’00s." The review said that "Jay Joyce’s production is looser and more organic than anything else on ‘Tornado,’ which helps make sure the overall message doesn’t come out clouded." Ben Foster of Country Universe gave the song an A, writing that Kimberly Schlapman "interprets the song with poise and subtlety, bringing a sense of genuineness and humanity […] while her bandmates join in with their signature heavenly harmonies when the song comes to its chorus." Foster stated that the writers "build the ballad around an effective, accessible metaphor, elevated by a gorgeous piercing melody that lingers after the song’s end" and praised Joyce's "elegantly restrained mandolin-driven" production.

Live performances
Little Big Town debuted the song on The Tonight Show with Jay Leno on September 26, 2013. They also performed it at the Country Music Association Awards on November 6, 2013.

Music video
The song's music video was premiered on ABC's The Chew on February 3, 2014. It was released to Vevo February 13, 2014.

Chart performance
"Sober" debuted at number 59 on the U.S. Billboard Country Airplay chart for the week of October 19, 2013. It also debuted at number 27 on the U.S. Billboard Hot Country Songs chart for the week of November 23, 2013. It also debuted at number 2 on the U.S. Billboard Bubbling Under Hot 100 Singles chart for the week of November 23, 2013.

References

2013 singles
Little Big Town songs
Songs written by Liz Rose
Songs written by Hillary Lindsey
Songs written by Lori McKenna
Song recordings produced by Jay Joyce
Capitol Records Nashville singles
2012 songs
Country ballads